Gebran Araiji (francisized transliteration Gébrane Oreiji) (1951 – 9 January 2019), was a Lebanese politician and president of the Syrian Social Nationalist Party (SSNP).

Early life 
Born in Zgharta, Gebran Araiji joined the SSNP in 1970 and worked since 1974 in the party's official organ publication. He emigrated to Latin America in 1975, then in France in 1977 and returned to Venezuela from 1978 to 1990.

Returning to Lebanon in 1990, he was President of Syrian Social Nationalist Party from 2001 to 2005.

References

External links
Gebran Araygi on Ehden Family Tree website

Syrian Social Nationalist Party in Lebanon politicians
1951 births
2019 deaths
Lebanese Maronites
People from Zgharta